Adnan Al-Rhimi (born April 9, 1988) is an amateur Tunisian freestyle wrestler, who played for the men's light heavyweight category. He won a gold medal for his division at the 2011 Pan Arab Games in Doha, Qatar, defeating Egypt's Ahmed Aboumansour.

Rhimi represented Tunisia at the 2008 Summer Olympics in Beijing, where he competed for the men's 84 kg class. He received a bye for the preliminary round of sixteen, before losing out to Armenia's Harutyun Yenokyan, who was able to score fourteen points in two straight periods, leaving Rhimi with a single point.

References

External links
 
 
 NBC Olympics Profile

1988 births
Living people
Olympic wrestlers of Tunisia
Wrestlers at the 2008 Summer Olympics
Sportspeople from Tunis
Tunisian male sport wrestlers
21st-century Tunisian people